Rene Alexis Bugueño Zenteno (born 2 October 1987) is a Chilean footballer currently playing for Santiago Morning.

Honours

Player
Deportes Antofagasta 
 Primera B (1): 2011 Apertura

External links
 
 

1987 births
Living people
Chilean footballers
C.D. Antofagasta footballers
O'Higgins F.C. footballers
Unión La Calera footballers
Deportes Copiapó footballers
Curicó Unido footballers
Ñublense footballers
Cobresal footballers
Chilean Primera División players
Primera B de Chile players
Association football defenders
People from Antofagasta